KYAC may refer to:

 KYAC (FM), a radio station (90.1 FM) licensed to serve Mill City, Oregon, United States
 KYAC-LP, a defunct low-power radio station (94.9 FM) formerly licensed to serve Mill City, Oregon